Shawn Merriman may refer to:

 Bishop convicted of mail fraud; see 
 Shawne Merriman, a former American football linebacker